The Story of a Maid (German: Der Roman eines Dienstmädchens) is a 1921 Austrian-German silent drama film directed by Reinhold Schünzel and starring Liane Haid, Otto Tressler and Erika Glässner. It premiered at the Marmorhaus in Berlin.

The film's sets were designed by the art directors Karl Machus and Oscar Friedrich Werndorff. It was shot in Vienna.

Cast
 Liane Haid
 Reinhold Schünzel
 Erika Glässner
 Mizzi Schützas Marie 
 Arnold Korff
 Otto Tressler as Leopold 
 Olga Engl as Charlotte 
 Loo Hardy as Effi 
 Ernst Behmer as Iwan 
 Carl Geppert as Ernst von Olten 
 Margarete Kupfer as Olga Ziesemack 
 Leonhard Haskel as August Kille 
 Charles Puffy as Mr. Brown 
 Trude Hesterberg as Lia de Pau 
 Emil Biron as Bildhauer 
 Karl Platen as Beamter 
 Eugen Rex as Herr aus der Provinz 
 Hilde Arndt
 Ernst Pröckl as Herbert

References

Bibliography
 Parish, Robert. Film Actors Guide. Scarecrow Press, 1977.

External links

1921 films
Films of the Weimar Republic
Films directed by Reinhold Schünzel
German silent feature films
1921 drama films
German drama films
Austrian drama films
National Film films
German black-and-white films
Silent drama films
1920s German films
1920s German-language films